Trox striatus is a beetle of the family Trogidae.

References 

striatus
Taxa named by Frederick Ernst Melsheimer
Beetles described in 1846